Penitentiary is a 1938 American crime film directed by John Brahm starring Walter Connolly,  John Howard, Jean Parker and Robert Barrat. It was the second Columbia Pictures film adaptation of the 1929 stage play The Criminal Code by Martin Flavin, after Howard Hawk's The Criminal Code (1931) and followed by Henry Levin's Convicted (1950).

Plot
William Jordan (Howard) is befriended by the man who sent him to prison on a manslaughter charge, former DA (District attorney) now prison warden Matthews (Connolly).  In order to give Jordan the opportunity to rehabilitate himself Matthews allows him to work as chauffeur to his daughter Elizabeth (Parker), though he's a bit uncomfortable when  Elizabeth falls in love with the young convict. All of this extra effort goes out the window when Jordan, adhering to the "criminal code" of never snitching on a fellow con, allows himself to be implicated in the murder of another convict. Jordan is saved from the death penalty by a last-minute confession of his hard-bitten but honorable cellmate.

Cast
 Walter Connolly as Thomas Matthews 	 
 John Howard as William Jordan 	 
 Jean Parker as Elizabeth Matthews 	 
 Robert Barrat as Captain Grady 	 
 Marc Lawrence as Jack Hawkins 	 
 Arthur Hohl as Finch 	 
 Dick Curtis as Tex 	 
 Paul Fix as Runch 	 
 Marjorie Main as Katie Matthews 	 
 Edward Van Sloan as Dr. Rinewulf 	 
 Ann Doran as Blanche Williams
 Dick Elliott as McNaulty
 Charles Halton as Leonard Nettleford 	 
 Thurston Hall as Judge 	 
 Ward Bond as Red, prison barber 	 
 John Gallaudet as State Attorney 	 
 Stanley Andrews as Captain Dorn 	 
 James Flavin as Doran 	 
 Bruce Mitchell as Bailiff 
 George Magrill as Richard

References

External links
 
 
 

1938 films
1938 crime drama films
1930s prison films
American black-and-white films
American crime drama films
American films based on plays
American prison drama films
Columbia Pictures films
1930s English-language films
Films directed by John Brahm
Films produced by Robert North
Films scored by Morris Stoloff
1930s American films